Channel Zero is an American horror anthology television series created by Nick Antosca, who serves as writer, showrunner, and executive producer. The series was greenlit for two 6-episode, self-contained seasons, which aired in late 2016 and late 2017 on Syfy. The storylines for the series are based on popular creepypastas. On February 9, 2017, Syfy renewed the series for a third and fourth season.

The series premiered on October 11, 2016. The first installment, based on Kris Straub's Candle Cove, stars Paul Schneider and Fiona Shaw and was directed by Craig William Macneill. It centers on Kris Straub's story of one man's obsessive recollection of a mysterious children's television program from the 1980s. The second season premiered on September 20, 2017, is based on Brian Russell's The No-End House and was directed by Steven Piet.

The third season, Butcher's Block, premiered on February 7, 2018, is based on Kerry Hammond's "Search and Rescue Woods" and was directed by Arkasha Stevenson. The fourth season, The Dream Door, was broadcast between October 26 and 31, 2018, is based on Charlotte Bywater's "Hidden Door" and was directed by E. L. Katz. On January 16, 2019, Syfy cancelled Channel Zero after four seasons.

Series overview

Plot
Season 1: Candle Cove

A child psychologist returns to his hometown to determine if his brother's disappearance is somehow connected to a series of similar incidents and a bizarre children's television series that aired at the same time.

Season 2: No-End House

A young woman and her group of friends visit a house of horrors only to find themselves questioning whether it is a tourist attraction or something more sinister.

Season 3: Butcher's Block

A young woman and her schizophrenic sister move to a city haunted by a series of disappearances and, after suspecting that they may be connected to a baffling rumor, they must work together to discover what is preying on the city's residents.

Season 4: The Dream Door

Newlyweds Jillian and Tom have each brought secrets into their marriage. When they discover a door in their basement, those secrets start to threaten their relationship — and their lives.

Cast and characters

Episodes

Season 1: Candle Cove (2016)
{{Episode table |background=#C6D9E4 |overall= |season= |title= |director= |writer= |airdate= |viewers= |country=US |episodes=

{{Episode list
 |EpisodeNumber   = 6
 |EpisodeNumber2  = 6
 |Title           = Welcome Home
 |WrittenBy       = Nick Antosca & Harley Peyton & Don Mancini
 |DirectedBy      = Craig William Macneill
 |OriginalAirDate = 
 |Viewers         = 0.42
 |ShortSummary    = Amy and Gary search for the children suspects and Gary is able to reclaim his own children from Candle Cove'''s control. Mike's wife, Erica, demands to know where Lily is, but he insists that he is the only one who can save her.  He takes Erica to the site of the murders and loses consciousness, entering Eddie's parallel world, which is filled with strange rooms and monsters. When he finally comes face to face with his brother, Eddie allows Lily to leave if Mike will stay forever. Lily returns to reality by crawling through a TV and is greeted by her mother. Marla goes to the woods where she is attacked by Mrs. Booth.  Marla is rescued at the last minute by Amy, who shoots Booth before Marla finally stabs her skull with the hook. Mike convinces Eddie to stay for one more card game they played as kids, delaying him long enough for Marla to return to the woods and suffocate Mike's body before Eddie can possess it.  Unable to break free of his world, Eddie is forced to remain with Mike.
 |LineColor       = F5F5F5
}}
}}

Season 2: No-End House (2017)

Season 3: Butcher's Block (2018)

Season 4: The Dream Door (2018)

 Production 
In 2015, Syfy announced that they had greenlit Channel Zero for twelve episodes, which would air as two six-episode seasons. The first season would center upon the popular creepypasta Candle Cove. The second season would focus on a new story, based on the creepypasta The No-End House. Universal Cable Production would serve as the production company for the series, with Max Landis and Nick Antosca both serving as the series' executive producers.

Craig William Macneill was chosen to direct the first season of Channel Zero in February 2016. Paul Schneider and Fiona Shaw were confirmed as starring in Channel Zero's first season in June 2016. Schneider was set to portray Mike Painter, a child psychologist whose twin brother went missing years before and whose mother, portrayed by Shaw, is reluctant to indulge his desire to investigate. Natalie Brown and Shaun Benson were also named as starring in the series. Filming began in Selkirk, Manitoba, Canada during May 2016 and wrapped on July 28, after 46 days of shooting.

Filming for Season 2 was set to start September 13, 2016 in Oakbank, Manitoba. An advance screening of the first episode premiered at San Diego Comic-Con. Creator Nick Antosca revealed on Twitter that season 2 would premiere on September 20, 2017.

Filming for Season 3 took place from July to August 30, 2017 in Winnipeg, Manitoba, Canada.

Filming for Season 4 began in early May 2018 and wrapped that July.

Music score
In season 2, "Bathysphere" by Cat Power plays at the end of the first episode. "Concrete Walls" from Fever Ray's eponymous album plays during the end of the third episode and "Between the Bars" from Madeleine Peyroux's Careless Love plays at the start of the sixth episode.

In season 3, portions of "Koyaanisqatsi" by Philip Glass play during the fifth and sixth episodes. Some of the Kyrie from György Ligeti's Requiem is also heard during the sixth episode. Selections from The Caretaker's An Empty Bliss Beyond This World also recur as motifs throughout all six episodes of the season.

Broadcast
Showcase broadcasts each season in Canada after Syfy has finished airing it within the United States. The horror streaming service Shudder streams all four seasons of the series as of October 10, 2019.

Reception

The first season of Channel Zero received generally favorable reviews from critics. On Rotten Tomatoes, it has an approval rating of 86% based on 21 reviews, with an average rating of 6.83/10. The site's critical consensus reads: "Creepy, unsettling, and refreshingly unique, Channel Zero: Candle Cove draws on easily relatable childhood fears while peeling back layers of spine-tingling mystery." On Metacritic it has a rating of 75 out of 100 based on 5 reviews. 

The second season received highly favorable reviews from critics. On Rotten Tomatoes, it has an approval rating of 100% based on 14 reviews, with an average rating of 8.4/10. The site's critical consensus reads: "No End House's central mystery is stronger and scarier than Channel Zero's first, solidifying its status as one of TV's scariest horror offerings."

The third season on Rotten Tomatoes has an approval rating of 100% based on 11 reviews, with an average rating of 8.5/10. The site's critics consensus reads, "Creepier than ever, Channel Zero: Butcher's Block'' delivers the disturbing elements a good horror demands, with the added bonus of a solid narrative.".

Ratings
<noinclude>

Season 1: Candle Cove (2016)

Season 2: No-End House (2017)

Season 3: Butcher's Block (2018)

Awards and nominations

References

External links
 
 

2016 American television series debuts
2018 American television series endings
2010s American horror television series
Adaptations of works by Kris Straub
2010s American anthology television series
Filicide in fiction
Fratricide in fiction
Fiction about mind control
Television series about parallel universes
Syfy original programming
Television series based on short fiction
Television series about fictional serial killers
Television series about missing people
Television series about television
Television series based on Internet-based works
Television series by Universal Content Productions
Television shows filmed in Manitoba
Television shows set in Ohio
Works about psychology
Works by Max Landis